Weaver is an unincorporated community in Randolph County, West Virginia, United States.

The community was named after Henry Weaver, a mining official.

References 

Unincorporated communities in West Virginia
Unincorporated communities in Randolph County, West Virginia